Hana Jonášová is a Czech opera singer active in concerts, recitals, and operas. A coloratura soprano, she is currently a principal artist at the Prague State Opera. She notably won second prize at the Golden Prague Festival, for her performance in Bohuslav Martinů's Les larmes du couteau (The Tears of a Knife).

Biography
Hana is the daughter of internationally renowned opera singer Jana Jonášová. She studied under her mother at the Academy of Performing Arts in Prague. While still a student she began performing in roles at the opera house in Ústí nad Labem.

For the past decade she has been a regular performer at the National Theatre as a member of the Prague State Opera. In May 2003 she portrayed the title heroine in the Czech premiere of Scott Joplin's ragtime opera Treemonisha. Her other roles with the company include both Despina and Fiordiligi in Così fan tutte, Donna Elvira in Don Giovanni, the First Lady in The Magic Flute, Gilda in Rigoletto, Rosina in The Barber of Seville, Sussana in The Marriage of Figaro, and Zerlina in Don Giovanni. She also has appeared with the company in numerous Czech operas by Smetana, Dvořák, Janáček and Martinů.

On the concert stage, Jonášová has sung in concert with all of the major Czech symphony orchestras and recorded works for Czech TV and Czech Radio. She has also appeared in concerts with orchestras in Belgium, China, Denmark, England, Finland, Germany, Luxembourg, Poland, and Russia. She recently toured Japan with violinist Gabriela Demeterová and the Czech Philharmonic Collegium.

References

Sources
Biography of Hana Jonášová at opera.cz (in Czech)

Year of birth missing (living people)
Living people
Academy of Performing Arts in Prague alumni
Czech operatic sopranos
21st-century Czech women opera singers